Tessaropa hispaniolae is a species of beetle in the family Cerambycidae. It was described by Lingafelter in 2010.

References

Methiini
Beetles described in 2010